Alexander MacLeod, Alexander Macleod or Alexander McLeod may refer to:

Alexander Macleod (MP) (c. 1715 – 1790), British politician
Alexander Roderick McLeod (c. 1782–1840), Canadian fur trader and explorer 
Alexander McLeod (1796–1871), Canadian citizen accused and tried in New York of instigating the Caroline affair
Alexander McLeod (1832–1902), founding member of the Royal Arsenal Co-operative Society
Alexander Donald McLeod (1872–1938), New Zealand politician
Alexander Samuel MacLeod (1888–1956), Canadian-born painter
Alexander Albert MacLeod (1902-1970), Canadian pacifist and YMCA secretary
Alexander MacLeod (writer) (1972- ), Canadian short story writer and university professor
Alexander Macleod (footballer), played in 2010–11 Elgin City F.C. season